Anish Kumar Giri (born 28 June 1994) is a Russian-Dutch chess Grandmaster. A chess prodigy, he completed the requirements for the title Grandmaster at the age of 14 years, 7 months and 2 days. FIDE awarded him the title in 2009. Giri is a four-time Dutch champion (2009, 2011, 2012, and 2015) and won the Corus Chess B Group in 2010. He has represented the Netherlands at five Chess Olympiads (2010, 2012, 2014, 2016, 2018). 

He has also won major international tournaments, including the 2012 Reggio Emilia tournament, 2017 Reykjavik Open and shared 1st place in the 2015 London Chess Classic and 2023 Wijk aan Zee. In 2019 he won clear first at the Third Edition of the Shenzhen Masters, deemed by some to be his first supertournament victory and supported by Dutch Chess Federation (KNSB).  Anish Giri is the No. 1 ranked player in the Netherlands, having switched from Russia in 2009. In 2021 Wijk aan Zee, Giri tied for first place with fellow Dutch GM Jorden van Foreest, but lost to him in the armageddon round after the two blitz games in the playoff ended in a draw. During the 2023 Tata Steel chess tournament, Giri edged out Nodirbek Abdusattorov on the last day to win the event, becoming the fourth Dutch player since 1968 (after Gennadi Sosonko, Jan Timman, and Jorden van Foreest), and 14th Dutch player overall, to do so.

Early life 
Giri was born in Saint Petersburg on 28 June 1994 to a Russian mother, Olga, and Nepalese father, Sanjay Giri. His grandmother is from India. In 2002, he moved to Sapporo, Japan with his parents and lived there until 2008.

Since February 2008, Giri and his family have lived in the Dutch town of Rijswijk, where his father worked at a research and consulting foundation. In June 2013, Giri graduated from Grotius College in Delft.

Chess career 
Giri began playing chess with his mother at age six. By age 11, he was rated above 2100 and continued to grow stronger. Giri's first club was a local youth sport club DYUSH-2 in Saint Petersburg, where his trainers were Asya Kovalyova and Andrei Praslov. He was a member of the Japan Chess Association and Sapporo Chess Club during his stay in Japan. In 2004, he won the Sapporo Chess Championship.

Giri developed quickly as a junior, his rating increasing rapidly between April 2006 and July 2010 from 2114 to 2672. Giri worked with trainer Vladimir Chuchelov between 2009–2012 and resumed in 2017. Giri also worked with Vladimir Tukmakov between 2013 and 2016.

2007–2008
Giri shared first place in the Russian Higher League Under-14s Boys Championship scoring 6½/9, winning the Saint Petersburg Boys Under 16s and coming third in the Under 18s event in 2007. The next year saw him share first at the Blokadny Saint Petersburg Open and win the Petrograd Winter Open scoring 8½/9. He followed with his first Grandmaster norm, achieved at the Intomart GfK Open sharing first with 7/9 in April 2008, sharing second at Kunsthalle GM Open and reaching his second Grandmaster norm at Groningen by sharing fourth place with 6½/9.

2009
Giri's first appearance at a major tournament came in his shared second place at Corus Chess Group C in January 2009 giving him his third GM norm, his Grandmaster status being confirmed in June. He also shared second at the Dutch Open, won the Dutch Championship and shared second at the Unive tournament.

2010
His performance in the previous year's Corus Chess Group C earned him a spot in Group B in 2010. He won the tournament with a score of 9/13, half a point ahead of Arkadij Naiditsch. Despite a disappointing result in the European Individual Championships, he drew a match with Nigel Short and won the Sigeman & Co tournament scoring 4½/5, coming second in the Dutch Championships behind Erwin L'Ami and was one of the best scorers for the Rising Stars team during the NH tournament against the Experienced team, but was unable to qualify for the Melody Amber tournament, losing on tiebreaks against Hikaru Nakamura.

It was revealed in May 2010 that Giri had aided Viswanathan Anand in preparation for the World Chess Championship 2010 against challenger Veselin Topalov. Anand won the match 6½–5½ to retain the title.

2011
At his debut appearance at Tata Steel in 2011 he scored 6½/13 (+2–2=9) and defeated Magnus Carlsen with Black in 22 moves. He also became Dutch champion for the second time and shared first place at Sigeman & Co with Wesley So and Hans Tikkanen.

2012–2013
Despite being the lowest ranked player, Giri won the 2012 Reggio Emilia chess tournament, claimed his third Dutch championship and shared third place at the strong Biel Chess Festival. His solid improvement continued with fourth place at the Reykjavik Open and a match victory against Vassily Ivanchuk at Leon in 2013. Giri took part in the 2012/13 FIDE Grand Prix cycle, but failed to qualify for the Candidates Tournament.

2014–2015
In 2014 Giri shared second place at the Tata Steel tournament, won individual bronze for his first board performance at the 41st Chess Olympiad in Tromso and finished second at the strong Qatar Masters Open.

In February 2015, Giri briefly crossed the 2800 mark in the live FIDE ratings by beating Peter Svidler at the FIDE Grand Prix in Tbilisi, but did not maintain the ranking level until the end of the month to appear in the official ratings. Giri participated in the 2014/15 FIDE Grand Prix cycle, but again failed to qualify for the Candidates Tournament.

2016
In March 2016, Giri participated in the Candidates Tournament 2016 in Moscow after qualifying (for the first time) as one of the two players with the highest average ratings for 2015.  At the tournament, he drew all 14 games. He went to the tournament with his wife Sopiko Guramishvili and his coach Vladimir Tukmakov.

As of 2016, Giri has been sponsored by the proprietary trading firm Optiver.

2017
Giri finished sixth in Norway Chess with a score of 4.5/9, scoring wins against Maxime-Vachier Lagrave and Anand but lost a "crash and burn" game in 17 moves versus Vladimir Kramnik. In April 2017, Giri won the Reykjavik Open with a score of 8½/10 (+7–0=3). He placed fourth in Your Next Move (Rapid and Blitz), Leuven, winning €15,000, his only appearance on the Grand Chess Tour of that year. In the FIDE Grand Prix, he placed ninth in Moscow, fifth in Geneva and thirteenth in La Palma, ending up twelfth overall. He reached the fourth round Section 3 of the Chess World Cup, losing to Vassily Ivanchuk in a tie-break. He won the European Club Cup as part of team Globus, alongside, among others, Kramnik, Alexander Grischuk and Sergey Karjakin.

2018
Giri started off 2018 by placing joint-first with Carlsen on a score of 9/13 (+5–0=8) at the 80th Tata Steel Masters. He was defeated in the blitz tie-break by Carlsen 1½–½.

In April 2018, he participated in the fifth edition of Shamkir Chess, finishing sixth with a score of 4½/9 (+1–1=7).

In July 2018, he competed in the 46th Dortmund Sparkassen Chess Meeting, placing second with a score of 4/7 (+2–1=4).

In November 2018, he shared first in the 2nd Dute Cup in Shenzhen, together with Vachier-Lagrave and Ding Liren and took second place on tie-break.

2019
Giri competed in the 81st Tata Steel Masters in January 2019, placing clear second with 8½/13 (+5−1=7), losing to Ian Nepomniachtchi in the first round.

In March 2019, Giri won the 3rd edition of the Shenzhen Masters (Dute Cup), placing clear first with 6½/10 (+3−0=7).

In May, Giri participated in the Moscow FIDE Grand Prix tournament, which is part of the qualification cycle for the 2020 World Chess Championship. The tournament was a 16-player event, and he was eliminated from the tournament after an upset loss to the lowest ranked player, GM Daniil Dubov in the first round.

In December 2019, Giri qualified for the Candidates Tournament 2020 as a player with the highest FIDE rating for the 12 months period
(January–December 2019). In the rating list, Giri led Vachier-Lagrave by an average of 6 points.

2020–2022 
Giri played in the Candidates Tournament 2020 which was suspended at the halfway point due to the COVID-19 pandemic. At the time he was on shared third place, with 3½/7, one point behind the two leaders. His second during the event was Erwin l'Ami. At the continuation of the Candidates Tournament in April 2021, he finished shared on third place with 7.5/14, together with Fabiano Caruana.

From 12 to 14 June 2020, Giri participated in the MrDodgy Invitational. He managed to win first place in this event, beating GM David Navara 7–2 in the finals.

At the 83rd Tata Steel Masters held in January, Giri shared first place with Jorden van Foreest on a score of 8½/13 (+4-0=9). The tie-break involved two blitz games, followed by an armageddon game if scores were level after blitz. They drew both blitz tie-breaks and Giri lost the armageddon game when he ran out of time, despite van Foreest blundering a pawn and then a bishop in the frantic time scramble. Giri finished as the runner-up of the tournament.

Giri won the 2021 Magnus Carlsen Invitational, a non-FIDE-rated online tournament, after defeating Ian Nepomniachtchi in the finals in tie-breaks.

From 12 to 16 May 2021, Giri participated in the second edition of the MrDodgy Invitational, a blitz tournament. The top-seeded Giri defeated Baadur Jobava in the finals to clinch first place for the second time in a row.

At the Chess World Cup 2021, the 4th seeded Giri was defeated in an upset by 68th seed Nodirbek Abdusattorov.

In September 2021, Anish Giri won the Tolstoy Cup tournament organized by the State Leo Tolstoy Museum-Estate 'Yasnaya Polyana' and the Chess Federation of Russia.

Through February and March 2022, Giri played in the FIDE Grand Prix 2022. In the second leg, he won his pool with a 4/6 result but lost to Dmitry Andreikin 2.5–1.5 in the semifinals. In the third leg, he finished last in Pool D with a result of 2.5/6, finishing 11th in the standings with seven points.

2023

At the Tata Steel Chess Tournament  2023, Giri beat World Chess Champion Magnus Carlsen in classical chess for the first time in 12 years. Giri later defeated World No. 2 Ding Liren and ended in round 13 by defeating the Romanian Grandmaster Richárd Rapport. His victory against Ding contributed to Ding's rating dropping below 2800, which left only Magnus Carlsen with a rating above 2800. Giri went on to win the event.

Team chess

Chess Olympiads
Giri has represented the Netherlands at five Chess Olympiads earning three individual bronze medals and scoring a total of 28,5 points from 40 games(+19-2=19).

Other team results

Giri has also competed in a World Team Championship, two European Team Championships and a World Cities Championship, earning a team gold medal in the World Cities Championship:

Giri has played for numerous clubs in team tournaments including SK Turm Emsdetten since 2008 in the Chess Bundesliga, HSG (Hilversum Chess Society), the Delftsche SchaakClub (Delft Chess Club), HMC Calder and En Passant. He used to play in Spanish league for chess club Sestao Naturgas Energia. He used to play in the French league (TOP-16) for l'Echiquier Châlonnais and Russian league for SHSM-64 (Moscow). He has participated and won the prestigious European Club Cup with Azeri SOCAR and Russian Siberia.

Playing style 
Giri's playstyle has been described as "solid and conservative" in chess terms. This makes him very difficult to defeat, but also leads to him often losing the chance to convert an advantage into a victory. Nonetheless his peers acknowledge his strengths as a player, with Grandmaster Arkadij Naiditsch stating that beating world champion Magnus Carlsen is easier than beating Giri.

Notable games 
Giri vs Magnus Carlsen, TATA Steel (2011). Neo-Grünfeld defense: Exchange Variation. Giri wins in 22 moves and was quoted later as saying "Carlsen will probably not lose like this again in the next ten years".

Giri vs Ding Liren, Xinqiao Cup (2017). Giuoco Piano. Giri sacrifices a rook in a decisive kingside attack.

Giri vs Ding Liren, Candidates, Yekaterinburg Russia (2021). Ruy Lopez. Giri sacrifices a bishop to win in a deferred-exchange variation Ruy Lopez. Giri moved into second place in the tournament after the win, a half-point behind Nepomniachtchi. Giri eventually dropped to third place in the tournament.

Personal life 
Giri is fluent in Russian, English, and Dutch and moderately proficient in Japanese, Nepali and German. He is married to fellow chess player and international master Sopiko Guramishvili; the couple were married on 18 July 2015. They have two sons.

He annotated a number of top games for the popular chess site ChessBase, and has written several articles, including analyses of his own games for chess magazines, such as New in Chess, 64 (chess magazine), and Schach Magazin 64. He used to be a columnist for the magazine ChessVibes Training. Giri has created two Chessable courses, featuring the Sicilian Najdorf and French Defence openings, which has led to some banter among other GMs.

In 2014, Giri published his first book, My Junior Years In 20 Games.

Giri also has a YouTube channel, which has over 179,000 subscribers as of January 2023.

References

External links 

 
 
 
 
 
 

1994 births
Living people
Chess grandmasters

Dutch chess players
Chess Olympiad competitors
Dutch people of Nepalese descent
Naturalised citizens of the Netherlands
People from Rijswijk
Russian emigrants to the Netherlands
Russian people of Nepalese descent
Dutch people of Russian descent